The Pribilof Islands (formerly the Northern Fur Seal Islands;) are a group of four volcanic islands off the coast of mainland Alaska, in the Bering Sea, about  north of Unalaska and 200 miles (320 km) southwest of Cape Newenham. About  in total area, they are mostly rocky and are covered with tundra, with a population of 572 as of the 2010 census.

Principal islands
The principal islands are Saint Paul and Saint George. The former was named for the Feast of Saints Peter and Paul, on the day of which the island was first encountered by the Russian explorer Gavriil Pribylov; the latter was probably named for the ship sailed by Pribylov. The Otter and Walrus islets are near St. Paul. The islands are part of the Bering Sea unit of the Alaska Maritime National Wildlife Refuge.

Fur trade
While oral traditions of the Aleut people maintain the islands were sparingly visited, "no ethnohistoric or archaeological evidence points to the use or occupation of the Pribilof Islands... by any native people before the Russian period in Alaska." The seasonal migrations of the northern fur seal became known by the Russians in the 1780s. Swimming north through the Aleutian Islands, the seals returned in the autumn with newly born pups. The unknown northern breeding grounds became a focus of Russian trappers. An employee of the Lebedev-Lastochkin Company, Gavriil Pribylov, sailed in 1786 to discover the location, after disobeying orders to retrieve company property in the Kurile Islands. The rookeries Pribylov visited held upwards of four million seals, for which they became famous. The islands became site to the LLC's first artel in what later became Russian America.

With the creation of the Russian-American Company, a monopoly, Russian operations continued on the islands. Under the Alaska Purchase sovereignty was passed to the United States in 1867. From 1870 to 1890, the U.S. government leased them to the Alaska Commercial Company. From 1890 through 1910, the North American Commercial Company held the monopoly on seal-hunting there, but the industry shrank considerably owing to seal-hunting on the open sea.

The North Pacific Fur Seal Convention of 1911 was signed by the United Kingdom, Japan, Russia, and the United States to restrict hunting in the area. Under the Fur Seal Act of 1966, hunting of the seals was forbidden in the Pribilofs, with the exception of subsistence hunting by native Aleuts.

Ambrose Bierce suggested renaming the islands 'locus sigilli' ("Place of the Seal (emblem)") in his The Devil's Dictionary.

A post office was established for the Pribilofs in 1948 at St. Paul, with Mrs. Ruth Anderson as postmistress.

Seal Island Historic District

Naturalist and paleontologist Roy Chapman Andrews visited the islands in 1913 aboard the schooner Adventuress on her maiden voyage with John Borden and crew. His films of fur seals led to efforts to protect the animals. The buildings on St. George and St. Paul Islands related to the hunting of the northern fur seal make up the national historic district.

Today
Residents are concentrated in the towns of St. Paul and St. George, each on the island of the same name. Many of the residents of the islands are related.  St. Paul and St. George each have small airports; air service is provided from the Alaskan mainland.

St. Paul has a population of 479 (2010 census), with its economy heavily dependent on the annual taking of the snow crab and on subsistence and commercial halibut harvests. Support services to commercial fleets plying the waters of the Bering Sea also contribute to the economy. The balance of economic activity on the island relates to working for the United States Government. The U.S. Coast Guard maintains a base on St. Paul, but no longer maintains a LORAN-C master station, as LORAN technology has been replaced by satellite navigation. The National Weather Service has a station on the island, and the National Oceanic and Atmospheric Administration maintains a presence.

St. George has a population of 102. Its economy is similar to that of St. Paul.

The Pribilof Islands are a birdwatching attraction, home to many species that do not fly in North America beyond Alaska. More than 240 species have been identified, and an estimated two million seabirds nest there annually. St. Paul is particularly popular, having a high cliff wall, known as Ridge Wall, above the Bering Sea.

See also

Harrison Gray Otis, chief government agent in 1879

References

External links

The AMIQ Institute – a research project documenting the Pribilof Islands and their inhabitants
FURSEAL.HTML – summary of the Fur Seal Act at U.S. Fish & Wildlife Service web site. Retrieved on April 16, 2008.
16 U.S.C. CHAPTER 24—CONSERVATION AND PROTECTION OF NORTH PACIFIC FUR SEALS – text of the U.S. Code on the U.S. Government Printing Office web site. Retrieved on April 16, 2008.
Alaska Fisheries Science Center Historical Corner: The Pribilof Islands Retrieved on July 23, 2014.
 Pribilof Islands Seal Trade Collection at Dartmouth College Library

 
Islands of the Aleutian Islands
Islands of the Bering Sea
Islands of Aleutians West Census Area, Alaska
Alaska Maritime National Wildlife Refuge
Protected areas of Aleutians West Census Area, Alaska
Islands of Alaska
Islands of Unorganized Borough, Alaska